Far Eastern Hospital is a metro station in Taipei, Taiwan served by Taipei Metro.

Station layout

The two-level underground station makes use of island platforms and has three exits. The station is 243 meters long and 20.5 meters wide. Blue line trains from Kunyang or Taipei Nangang Exhibition Center terminate here during non-rush hours.

Design
The entrance to the station was designed as an arch bridge (from "qiao" in Banqiao, meaning "bridge"). It is also meant to represent a "cloud wall", a characteristic of traditional Chinese gardening; the station is located next to Yuanzhi Memorial Garden.

Public art in the station consists of a piece titled "River Romance", which combined LED lamps with glass sticks to create a color-changing "river of time". Poems are engraved on the glass sticks, which look like moving waves from a distance.

Around the station
 Far Eastern Memorial Hospital
 Asia Eastern University of Science and Technology
 New Taipei City Library
 Taipei Far Eastern Telecom Park
 TPKC Cloud Computing Center
 A.mart Banqiao Nanya Store

References

Railway stations opened in 2006
Bannan line stations